Kathleen Depoorter (born 5 September 1971) is a Belgian politician and a member of the Member of the Chamber of Representatives for the N-VA party.

Biography
Since the municipal elections of 2012, Depoorter has been a municipal councilor for the N-VA in Evergem. She has also served as an alderman for finance and budget, public health, local economy, international cooperation and animal welfare in Evergem. In the 2018 municipal elections, she was re-elected as a municipal councilor and continued to serve as alderman with the same portfolio of competences. From 2017 to 2018 she was also a provincial councilor for East Flanders. Depoorter was elected a member of the Chamber of Representatives for the East Flanders electoral district in the elections of 26 May 2019.

Before entering politics, Depoorter was the manager and owner of a pharmacy store.

References

1971 births
Living people
Members of the Chamber of Representatives (Belgium)
New Flemish Alliance politicians
21st-century Belgian politicians
21st-century Belgian women politicians